Druze revolt can refer to the following:

 Druze power struggle (1658–1667)
 1838 Druze revolt
 1860 Lebanon conflict
 1895 Druze rebellion
 Hauran Druze rebellion (1909–1910)
 Great Syrian Revolt 1924–1927
 1954 Druze revolt